Anomaly is the second full-length album released by The Hiatus on June 30, 2010. It peaked at No. 5 on the Oricon album chart. Tez Humphreys drew the illustration for the record jacket.

Track listing

Recording members 
 Takeshi Hosomi: vocal, guitar 
 masasucks: guitar 
 Koji Ueno: bass guitar 
 Takashi Kashikura: drums
 Masakazu Ichise: drums, percussions (track 9)
 Hirohisa Horie: electronic keyboard, synthesizer
 Ichiyo Izawa: piano (track 9)
 Seigen Tokuzawa: string instruments (track 5)

References 

2010 albums
The Hiatus albums